John A. Cody (June 17, 1921 – April 4, 2001) was a notorious New York union leader and racketeer. He was the president of the Teamsters union Local 282 between 1976 and 1984, during which time he utilized strikes, extortion and mafia intimidation to bend developers to his will and gained a fearsome reputation within the New York construction industry.

Biography

Cody was born in the Hells Kitchen neighborhood of Manhattan. Cody got his start in the Teamster's union as a $1-a-day trucker's helper in his teens. He was imprisoned for armed robbery in his early 20s shortly after serving as a U.S. Marine towards the end of World War II.

At the height of his power Cody was considered the "construction industry's most powerful union leader."  In 1982, federal prosecutors convicted him of extortion, at a time when Cody was so feared by construction workers that they built his beach house for him in South Hampton and provided him with chauffeurs free of charge.  Cody used the mafia in New York to further intimidate developers, first working with the Gambino crime family and then Paul Castellano. Cody would kickback at least $200,000 a year to the mafia and was also convicted of providing a $2 million loan to Chicago mobsters.

Cody was responsible for delivering cement and building materials for virtually every major building site in Manhattan from the mid-1970s to the mid-'80s. Tom Galvin, who was chief operating officer of the Battery Park City Authority, the agency that oversaw the construction Gateway Plaza, said, "LeFrak didn't get around John Cody. Nobody did." (Sam LeFrak was the developer of the Gateway Plaza). It was reported that John Cody added millions of dollars to the Gateway Plaza's costs. At the work site of the AT&T Building, Cody blamed black workers for creating dangerous work conditions in order to ensure additional union members would receive jobs. He told contractors that extra union workers equipped with walkie-talkies would be required at the job site  to ensure safe working conditions. Cody threatened strikes if developers did not comply with his demands, and considering the huge costs a strike would incur, developers often capitulated.

Cody was known for his cautious behavior, including installing anti-bugging devices in his phones and patting guests at his home for bugs. As a result, federal prosecutors described him as a tough case to crack. However, Cody eventually went to jail for racketeering and Robert Sasso, the Treasurer of 282, took power. In what federal prosecutors described as a "desperate attempt" to regain power, Cody hired a former jailhouse inmate to assassinate Sasso. The inmate was an informant for the FBI, and recorded conversations about the plot, including Cody discussing "relative merits of using explosives or a gun with a silencer," to kill Sasso. Cody went to prison for attempted murder as a result.

Cody died of Alzheimer's disease in 2001, at the age of 79.

References 

1921 births
American trade unionists
2001 deaths